Tonya is a settlement in Western Uganda.

Location
Tonya is located in Hoima District, along the eastern shores of Lake Albert. The coordinates of Tonya are:1°35'01.0"N, 31°04'59.0"E (Latitude:1.583611; 31.083056).

Overview
Tonya lies in the oil-rich Albertine Graben. Tonya is located close to the Waraga-1 Oil Well, the first free-flowing oil well in East Africa south of the Sudan, flow tested in 2008.

See also
Kaiso, Uganda
Nzizi Power Station
Uganda Oil Refinery
Uganda-Kenya Crude Oil Pipeline

References

External links
 Oil Opens New Chapter for Hoima Residents
 The Impact of Oil Discovery on Hoima District
 UNRA Officials Created 9 ‘Ghost’ Kilometres on Hoima-Kaiso-Tonya Road
 Contamination Delays Oil Exploration In Ntoroko
 

Populated places in Western Region, Uganda
Bunyoro sub-region
Hoima District